Leandro Vella (born 9 November 1996) is an Argentine professional footballer who plays as a winger for Alvarado.

Club career
Vella started his career with Escuela Pablo Kratina, which preceded a move to Huracán de Córdoba in 2008. In 2011, Instituto signed Vella. Having spent five years in the youth ranks of the Córdoba club, his professional bow came in a goalless draw with Gimnasia y Esgrima on 31 January 2016; which was followed by his opening goal two appearances later against Estudiantes. Further goals arrived versus Independiente Rivadavia, All Boys, Nueva Chicago and Almagro. After five goals in sixteen fixtures in 2016, Vella followed that up with a sole goal in the same number of matches across the 2016–17 campaign.

In August 2017, Vella joined Torneo Federal A side Central Córdoba on loan. Eleven goals, including a Copa Argentina hat-trick over San Lorenzo, followed as they won promotion to tier two. Primera División team Godoy Cruz announced the signing of Vella on 11 June 2019, ahead of the 2019–20 season. He scored one goal, versus Colón on 21 October, in fifteen total matches for them. On 16 July 2020, Vella sealed a return to Central Córdoba on a free transfer; with the club now in the Primera División.

After a spell at San Martín de Tucumán in 2021, Vella joined Primera Nacional side Alvarado ahead of the 2022 season.

International career
At a young age, Vella was called up by the Argentina U15s.

Personal life
In December 2018, Vella was involved in a serious one-person, single-vehicle crash. Despite the car ending on its roof without wheels, Vella escaped unharmed.

Career statistics
.

References

External links

1996 births
Living people
Footballers from Córdoba, Argentina
Argentine footballers
Association football midfielders
Primera Nacional players
Torneo Federal A players
Argentine Primera División players
Instituto footballers
Central Córdoba de Santiago del Estero footballers
Godoy Cruz Antonio Tomba footballers
San Martín de Tucumán footballers
Club Atlético Alvarado players